is the fourth studio album by Japanese pop band The Tambourines. It was released on November 2, 2005, almost two years after the release of Home Again through Giza Studio.

Background
The album consists of two previous released singles, such as "Never ever ~Aki ha Chotto Samishiku~" and "Don't stop the music".

"Never ever" received special mix under title album version. The composer of Don't stop the music, Aika Ohno self-cover this single in her cover album Silent Passage.

Nine songs out of eleven were composed by band themselves.

This albums consist of total 11 tracks which makes the longest studio album in their history.

This is their last studio album. Till the hiatus they continue release only mini albums.

Chart performance
The album charted at No. 270 on the Oricon charts in its first week. It charted for one week.

Track listing
All the tracks are arranged by Hiroshi Asai

In media
Never ever ~Aki ha Chotto Samishiku~: ending theme for Nihon TV program Coming Doubt (カミングダウト)
Don't stop music: ending theme for Tokyo Broadcasting System Television program Azaassu!

References

2005 albums
Being Inc. albums
Japanese-language albums
Giza Studio albums